Split(s) or The Split may refer to:

Places
 Split, Croatia, the largest coastal city in Croatia
 Split Island, Canada, an island in the Hudson Bay
 Split Island, Falkland Islands
 Split Island, Fiji, better known as Hạfliua

Arts, entertainment, and media

Films
 Split (1989 film), a science fiction film
 Split (2016 American film), a psychological horror thriller film
 Split (2016 Canadian film), also known as Écartée, a Canadian drama film directed by Lawrence Côté-Collins
 Split (2016 South Korean film), a sports drama film
 Split: A Divided America, a 2008 documentary on American politics
 The Split (1959 film) or The Manster, a U.S.-Japanese horror film
 The Split (film), a 1968 heist film

Games
 Split (poker), the division of winnings in the card game
 Split (blackjack), a possible player decision in the card game

Music

Albums
 Split (The Groundhogs album), 1971
 Split (Lush album), 1994
 Split (Peter Pan Speedrock and Zeke EP), 2005
 Split (Patricia Barber album), 1989
 The Split CD, a 1998 EP by Queens of the Stone Age and Beaver

Songs
 "Split" (KMFDM song), 1991
 "Split" (Tesla Boy song), from the album The Universe Made of Darkness
 "Split/Whole Time", a song from the Lil Yachty album Lil Boat 3
 "Split" by Willow, from the album Coping Mechanism

Other uses in music
 Split (composition), a 2015 orchestral composition by Andrew Norman
 Split album, an album by two or more artists

Television
 Split (TV series), an Israeli TV series
 The Split (TV series), a British TV series
 "Split" (Coupling episode), an episode of the TV series Coupling

Other uses in arts, entertainment, and media
Split (novel), a 2010 novel by Swati Avasthi
Split (sculpture), a 2003 outdoor sculpture by Roxy Paine in Seattle, Washington, US
Split Dynasty, an alien species of the X game series

Naval vessels
 Yugoslav destroyer Split, decommissioned in 1980
 Yugoslav frigate Split, Koni-class

Science and computing
 Split (graph theory)
 Split (mathematics), a property of an exact sequence
 Split (phylogenetics), a bipartition of a set of taxa in phylogenetics
 split (Unix), a Unix software utility (command) for dividing input into multiple files

Sport and dance
 Split (bowling)
 Split (gymnastics), a body position
 Split jump, a type of jump in figure skating
 Split leap or jumping, a class of dance leaps

Other uses
 Split (bottle size), a wine bottle size
 Australian Labor Party split of 1955, or the Split

See also
 Banana split, a dessert
 Split system, a type of air conditioning system consisting of both indoor and outdoor units
 Division (disambiguation)
 Split (divorce)
 Phonemic split, an evolutionary change of a language in which one phoneme evolves into two discrete phonemes
 Segment (disambiguation)
 Separation (disambiguation)
 Split screen (disambiguation)
 Splitter (disambiguation)
 Stock split, a corporation dividing or consolidating its shares
 Split decision, combat sports term when a fight is scored non-unanimously for one fighter by all judges